Omorgus mariae is a species of hide beetle in the subfamily Omorginae.

References

mariae
Beetles described in 1986